Bokarina is a coastal suburb in the Sunshine Coast Region, Queensland, Australia, located within the Kawana Waters urban centre.

History

The name Bokarina was bestowed at the request of the land developer, Alfred Grant Pty Ltd, in the belief that the name was an Aboriginal expression indicating middle i.e. half-way along the Kawana Waters land-development scheme in 1969.

In the early 1980s, Bokarina emerged as Bokarina Beach, with an initial subdivision between the foreshore reserve and the sports complex on Nicklin Way.

Kawana Waters State High School opened 28 January 1986. Bokarina State School opened on 27 January 1987. On 1 January 2006 the two schools was amalgamated to form Kawana – Bokarina State College, which was renamed on 3 March 2006 to become Kawana Waters State College.

Kawana Waters Uniting Church was dedicated by Reverend Raymond F. Hunt (Moderator of the Uniting Church in Australia, Queensland Synod) on 20 July 1986.

The median age of the Bokarina population was 38 years, 1 year above the national median of 37. 81.8% of people living in Bokarina were born in Australia. The other top responses for country of birth were England 5.1%, New Zealand 4.7%, Philippines 0.6%, Scotland 0.5%, Germany 0.5%. 93.9% of people spoke only English at home; the next most common languages were 0.6% German, 0.6% Mandarin, 0.4% Tagalog, 0.4% Cantonese, 0.3% Punjabi.

Education 
Kawana Waters State College is a government primary and secondary (Prep-12) school for boys and girls at 119 Sportsmans Parade. In 2018, the school had an enrolment of 1614 students with 130 teachers (118 full-time equivalent) and 64 non-teaching staff (45 full-time equivalent). It includes a special education program.

Amenities
Kawana Waters Uniting Church is at 3 Honeysuckle Drive.

References

External links
 

Suburbs of the Sunshine Coast Region
Kawana Waters, Queensland
Coastline of Queensland